The fairy tern (Sternula nereis) is a small tern which is native to the southwestern Pacific. It is listed as "Vulnerable" by the IUCN and the New Zealand subspecies is "Critically Endangered".

There are three subspecies:
 Australian fairy tern, Sternula nereis nereis (Gould, 1843) – breeds in Australia
 New Caledonian fairy tern, Sternula nereis exsul (Mathews, 1912) – breeds in New Caledonia
 New Zealand fairy tern, Sternula nereis davisae (Mathews & Iredale, 1913) – breeds in northern New Zealand

Description
The fairy tern is a small tern with a white body and light bluish-grey wings.A small black patch extends no further than the eye and not as far as the bill. In the breeding plumage both the beak and the legs are yellowish-orange. During the rest of the year the black crown is lost, being mostly replaced by white feathers, and the beak becomes black at the tip and the base. The sexes look alike and the plumage of immature birds is similar to the non-breeding plumage.

Behaviour
The fairy tern mainly feeds on fish which it catches by hovering over the sea before plunging beak first into the water to grab its prey. It seldom goes far out to sea but is often to be seen where predatory fish are feeding on shoals of small fish. It also consumes crustaceans, molluscs and some plant material.

Breeding takes place in the spring in colonies on sheltered beaches on the mainland or on offshore islands. The nest is just above high-water mark and is a scrape in the sand. One or two eggs are laid and both parents share the incubation and care of the chicks and have occasionally been seen providing post-fledging parental care.

Status
Formerly classified as a Species of Least Concern by the IUCN, recent research shows that its numbers have been decreasing rapidly throughout its range; the New Zealand subspecies has been on the brink of extinction for decades. The fairy tern was consequently uplisted to Vulnerable status in 2008. The New Zealand fairy tern has numerous breeding areas, largely incorporating the upper-north region of the North Island. In 2011, there were only about 42 known individuals. With a breeding program in place by the New Zealand Department of Conservation, the population was estimated in 2020 at 40.

References

 Douglas Adams & Mark Carwardine, Last Chance to See (Ballantine Books, 1992)

External links

 BirdLife Species Factsheet

fairy tern
fairy tern
Birds of New Caledonia
Birds of South Australia
Birds of Tasmania
Birds of Victoria (Australia)
Birds of Western Australia
fairy tern
fairy tern